Suket State was one of the Princely states of India during the period of the British Raj.  The capital of the state was Pangna. Its last ruler signed the accession to the Indian Union on 15 April 1948. Formerly it belonged to the States of the Punjab Hills and currently, it is part of the Indian state of Himachal Pradesh. The present-day Mandi district was formed with the merger of the two princely states of Mandi and Suket.

History
According to tradition the predecessor state was founded about 765 by Bira Sen (Vir Sen), claimed to be a son of a Sena dynasty King of Bengal. The early history of Suket was marred by constant warfare against other principalities, especially against the Kingdom of Kullu. At the time of Raja Bikram Sen, Kullu was under the overlordship of Suket State and was reduced to paying tribute to Suket. Raja Madan Sen's reign was the golden age of Suket, when its ruler reduced into submission the neighboring smaller states. During the reign of Raja Udai Sen Suket came under the influence of the Mughal Empire who were content with merely exacting tribute.

At the time of Raja Bikram Sen II, Sukket survived the invasion of the Gurkhas of Nepal (1803 to 1815) and the ensuing brief period of Sikh dominance thanks to the Raja's diplomatic skills. In 1845, when war broke out between the Sikhs and the British, the Rajas of Suket and Mandi took the side of the British, signing a Treaty of Alliance in Bilaspur in 1846. In the same year a sanad was granted to Raja Ugar Sen II confirming him and his heirs in the possession of the Suket territories.

Rulers
The rulers of Suket bore the title Raja. The clan name of the royal lineage was 'Suketi' or 'Suketr'.

Rajas
1663 - 1721                Jit Sen                            (d. 1721) 
1721 - 1748                Garur Sen                          (b. 1693 - d. 1748) 
1748 - 1762                Bhikam Sen                         (d. 1762) (Afghan invasions)
1762 - 1791                Ranjit Sen                         (d. 1791) 
1791 - 1838                Bikram Sen II                      (b. 17.. - d. 1838) 
1838 - 1876                Ugar Sen II                        (d. 1876) 
1876 - Apr 1878            Rudra Sen                          (b. 1828 - d. 1886) 
1878 - 1879                Arimardan Sen                      (b. 1863 - d. 1879) 
29 Mar 1879 – 27 May 1908  Dasht Nikandan Sen                 (b. 1865 - d. 1908) 
29 Mar 1879 - 1884         Munshi Hardyal Singh -Regent 
27 May 1908 – 12 Oct 1919  Bhim Sen                           (b. 1885 - d. 1919) (from 1 Jan 1918, Sir Bhim Sen)
13 Oct 1919 – 15 Aug 1947  Lakshman Sen                       (b. 1895 - d. 1970)

Demographics

Religion

See also
Punjab States Agency
Political integration of India
Lalit Sen
Hari Sen

Notes

References

External links 

Princely states of Punjab
History of Himachal Pradesh
Mandi district
8th-century establishments in India
765 establishments
1948 disestablishments in India
Former monarchies of Asia